The 2013–14 UEFA Futsal Cup was the 28th edition of Europe's premier club futsal tournament and the 13th edition under the current UEFA Futsal Cup format.

Preliminary round
The draw for the preliminary round and the main roud took place on 3 July 2013 in the UEFA headquarters in Nyon, Switzerland. First, the 29 lowest ranked teams were divided into 5 groups of 4 and 3 of 3 and later the tournament hosts were selected, which are indicated in italics. The preliminary round ran from 27 to 31 August, with only the group winners advancing to the next round.

Group A

Group B

Group C

Group D

Group E

Group F

Group G

Group H

Main round
Following the preliminary round draw, the seventeen teams allocated in the main round pot and the seven group winners were distributed into six groups of four. Matches are set to take place between 1 and 5 October, hosted by a selected club in each group, which is highlighted with italics. The top two teams in each group will join the four highest-ranked clubs, that are already in the elite round after received bye for the early stage of the tournament.

Group 1

Group 2

Group 3

Group 4

Group 5

Group 6

Elite round

Group A

Group B

Group C

Group D

Final four
The following teams have qualified for the final four round:
 FC Barcelona
 Dinamo Moskva
 Kairat Almaty
 Araz Naxçivan
Draw for the semi-finals was held on 12 March in Hilton Hotel in Baku.

Semifinals
All times are (UTC+2).

3rd and 4th place

Final

References

External links
 Official UEFA Futsal Cup website

UEFA Futsal Champions League
Cup